Brian Kim Stefans (born 1969) is an American poet.

Biography
He was born in Rutherford, New Jersey and, earned a bachelor's degree from Bard College and was awarded a Master of Fine Arts degree from Brown University after studies at the Graduate Center, CUNY.

His books of poetry include "Viva Miscegenation”: New Writing''' (MakeNow Books, 2013), Kluge: A Meditation and other works (Roof Books, 2007), What Is Said to the Poet Concerning Flowers (Heretical Texts, 2006), Angry Penguins (Harry Tankoos Books, 2000), Gulf (Object Editions, 1998) and Free Space Comix (Roof, 1998). Along with several chapbooks of poetry, his other books include Before Starting Over: Selected Interviews and Essays 1994-2005 (Salt Publishing, 2006) and Fashionable Noise: On Digital Poetics (Atelos, 2003) which includes experimental essays on the role of algorithm in poetry and culture.

A resident of New York from 1992-2005, Stefans was an active participant in the poetry culture of the city as an editor and organizer, publishing numerous reviews in outlets such as Publishers Weekly, The Boston Review, St. Mark's Poetry Project newsletter, Shark, Rain Taxi, Verse, Tripwire and other small journals in the United States and abroad.

Among other web activities, he created arras.net in 1998, a site devoted to new media poetry and poetics where his interactive art and digital poems such as "Suicide in an Airplane (1919)," “Star Wars (one letter at a time),” “The Dreamlife of Letters” and “Kluge: A Meditation” can be found. He is also a video artist, graphic designer and publisher of Arras Book, freely downloadable at arras.

Recent critical writing include “Conceptual Writing: The L.A. Brand”() published by Area Sneaks Sheets, the series “Third Hand Plays” for the website of the San Francisco Museum of Modern Art concerning electronic literature, and "Terrible Engines: A Speculative Turn in Recent Poetry and Fiction” that inaugurates his recent interest in applying concepts from recent Continental philosophy to new forms of literature. Writing on Asian American art and literature include “Remote Parsee: Asian American Poetry Since 1970” (in Telling It Slant: Avant-Garde Poetics of the 1990s'', 2001) and “Miscegenated Scripts: A Theory of Asian American New Media.”

Stefans's blog is Free Space Comix. He presently lives in Hollywood and is an associate professor of poetry, new media and screenplay studies in the English department of UCLA.

References

External links
 Arras.net
 Free Space Comix: the blog
 Poetry Foundation
 UCLA Department of English Faculty page 

1969 births
Living people
American male poets
Bard College alumni
Brown University alumni
Graduate Center, CUNY alumni
People from Rutherford, New Jersey
21st-century American poets
21st-century American male writers
Electronic literature writers